Brad R. Wilson is an American businessman, politician and a Republican member of the Utah House of Representatives representing District 15 since January 1, 2011. He lives in Kaysville, Utah, with his wife Jeni and their three children.

Personal life and education
Wilson earned his BA in business administration from Weber State University.

Wilson is the CEO of Newtown Development, a multi-family residential community developer in Utah. Prior to Newtown Development, Wilson was president and CEO of Destination Homes, a residential homebuilder. Prior to Destination Homes, Wilson was vice president with American Express Financial Advisors with responsibility for Utah operations.

Wilson is a member of the Utah Chapter of the Young President's Organization. He has served as the chair of the Davis Chamber of Commerce Board of Directors, the Chair of the Davis Economic Advisory Council, and board chair of Children's Aid Society of Utah. Wilson was named as one of Utah's Top 40 under 40 Business Professionals. He serves on the National Advisory Council for Weber State University and on the Construction Industry Advisory Council for Brigham Young University. He has a business degree from Weber State University and is a graduate of the College of Financial Planning.

Political career
Wilson was elected in November 2010, and currently serves as the Speaker of the House.  During the 2022 legislative session, he served on the Executive Appropriations Committee, House Legislative Expense Oversight Committee, Legislative Audit Subcommittee, Legislative Management Committee, Subcommittee on Oversight.

Wilson presented a motion in December 2020 to not give Salt Lake City school teachers the Covid-19 bonus of $1500 to prioritize districts that held in-person classes and put pressure on districts that were virtual, specifically, the Salt Lake City district.

Current legislation

In the 2022 General Session, Speaker Wilson only sponsored one bill, Great Salt Lake Watershed Enhancement. This bill had a $40 million fiscal note. This legislation is to enact the preservation and rescue of the Great Salt Lake. In addition to sponsoring this bill, Speaker Wilson also cosponsored 8 bills during the session.

Elections
2014 Wilson was unopposed in the Republican convention and faced Democrat Rich Miller in the general election. Wilson won with 5,861 votes (81.4%) to Miller's 1,339 votes (18.6%).
2012 Wilson was unopposed for the June 26, 2012 Republican primary and won the November 6, 2012 general election with 11,278 votes (80.9%) against Democratic candidate Gibbs Smith, who had run for the seat in 1996, 2000, and 2002.
2010 When District 15 incumbent Republican Representative Douglas C. Aagard left the Legislature and left the seat open, Wilson was one of two candidates from among four chosen by the Republican convention for the June 22, 2010 Republican primary, winning with 1,727 votes (45.2%) and won the November 2, 2010 general election with 7,794 votes (81.2%) against Democratic candidate Sherri Tatton.

References

External links
Official page at the Utah State Legislature
Campaign site

Brad R. Wilson at Ballotpedia
Links to bills sponsored by Rep. Wilson in 2014

|-

21st-century American politicians
Living people
Republican Party members of the Utah House of Representatives
People from Kaysville, Utah
Place of birth missing (living people)
Weber State University alumni
Year of birth missing (living people)